AMSO may refer to:

 American Shale Oil
 Army Modeling & Simulation Office
 Air Member for Supply and Organisation, now called Air Member for Materiel, in the Royal Air Force